KVLC (101.1 FM, "101 Gold") is a radio station licensed to serve Hatch, New Mexico.  The station is owned by Bravo Mic Communications, LLC.  It airs a classic hits music format and its sister stations are KOBE, KMVR, KXPZ.  Its studios are located in Las Cruces, and its transmitter is in Rincon, New Mexico.

The station was assigned the KVLC call letters by the Federal Communications Commission on March 25, 1994.

References

External links
KVLC official website
Bravo Mic Communications

VLC
Classic hits radio stations in the United States